Estadio Iván Elías Moreno is a multi-purpose stadium in the Villa El Salvador District, Lima, Peru.  It is currently used by football team Club Deportivo Municipal.  The stadium holds 10,000 people.

History
The plot turf where the stadium now stands was used by local amateur teams for many years before the construction of the stadium. The stadium is named after Iván Elías Moreno who was a young man from Villa El Salvador who was stabbed to death while trying to defend a teenager from being robbed. During his third term, district mayor Michel Azcueta decided to name the stadium to honor the memory of Moreno who had been his student while he, the mayor, was a school teacher in the district.

The inaugural game was between Defensor Villa del Mar and Guardia Republicana in the 2002 Peruvian Segunda Divisíon season in which the home team won by 4–0. Defensor Villa del Mar played its home games at this stadium until 2006 when it was relegated to the Copa Perú. Another three prominent teams have played their home matches at this stadium. Estudiantes de Medicina played one match at this stadium in 2006. In 2008, Raymondi Cashapampa won the Liga Provincial de Lima while playing its home matches at this stadium.

External links
 Frank Jasperneite pictures

References

Ivan Elias Moreno
Ivan Elias Moreno
Sports venues in Lima